SAPO (Portuguese for "toad" or "frog"), Servidor de Apontadores Portugueses Online (Online Portuguese Links Server), is a brand and subsidiary company of Altice Portugal. It is a media content and services provider that started out as a search engine when founded in 1995. Currently, their search engine is powered by Google.

History
SAPO was created on 4 September 1995 by the Computer Science Centre of the University of Aveiro. The name was derived from the acronym of the service, S.A.P.O. (Servidor de Apontadores Portugueses Online). This acronym corresponds to the Portuguese word for toad.

In 1997 SAPO was converted in a business and the company Navegante was created.

Later, in September 1998, Saber & Lazer - Informática e Comunicação S.A. bought SAPO from Navegante. With Saber & Lazer, SAPO launched new services; free e-mail, a virtual shopping and some new features for the search engine.

Still in that year, due to increasing traffic SAPO and Telepac signed an agreement, with 'Telepac' becoming their new internet service provider.

In September 1999, PT Multimédia acquired 74.9% of Saber e Lazer. And in March 2000, SAPO was assigned to PTM.com, with the objective of joining all internet projects under only one company.

After some improvements in infrastructures and accesses, finally in June 2002 the ADSL access service was launched, starting the era of new contents for the portal.

On 28 March 2006, SAPO XL was launched: a project for broadband content, in which the main content is videos, on-line television transmission and real-time transmission of events.

On 15 September 2010, SAPO launched its website in East Timor.

See also
 SAPO Codebits
 Altice Portugal
 Minho Campus Party
 University of Aveiro

References

External links
SAPO
Portal Imobiliário CASASAPO

Altice Portugal
Internet service providers of Portugal
Internet search engines
Web portals
Internet properties established in 1995